Dato' Seri Kerk Kim Tim @ Kerk Choo Ting (died 22 May 2018) was a former Taiping Member of Parliament and deputy president of the Malaysian People's Movement Party (Gerakan). He was also the former Deputy Minister of International Trade and Industry and a Deputy Minister of Agriculture and Agro-based on Malaysia and Agriculture Agro-Based Industry II before being replaced by Mah Siew Keong. His ministry was led by Tan Sri Muhyiddin Yassin at the time.

In the 1970s, Kerk served as legal counsel of a Chinese independent high school association. In the 1982 Malaysian state election, Kerk stood as Gerakan candidate on a Chinese educationalist platform.

On May 22, 2018, Dato' Seri Kerk Choo Ting died.

Election results

Honours

 Knight Commander of the Order of the Perak State Crown (D.P.M.P.) - Dato’ (1997)

 Commander of the Order of the Defender of State (D.G.P.N.) - Dato’ Seri (2002)

References

21st-century Malaysian politicians
Malaysian politicians of Chinese descent
Parti Gerakan Rakyat Malaysia politicians
Government ministers of Malaysia
2018 deaths
1941 births